Timothy Leemann (born 22 April 1991) is a Swiss former competitive figure skater. Competing in pair skating with partner Anaïs Morand, he is the 2011–2012 Swiss national champion. In July 2012, it was reported that their partnership had ended. Leemann also competed in single skating.

Programs

Pair skating with Morand

Single skating

Competitive highlights

Pair skating with Morand

Single skating

References

External links 

 
 

Swiss male pair skaters
Swiss male single skaters
1991 births
Living people
Figure skaters from Zürich